The list of ecoregions in Minnesota provides an overview to the ecoregions (see also, ecosystem)  in the U.S. state of Minnesota, as defined separately by the Environmental Protection Agency/Commission for Environmental Cooperation, the Minnesota Department of Natural Resources, and the World Wildlife Fund.

Environmental Protection Agency/Commission for Environmental Cooperation

Minnesota Department of Natural Resources
The Minnesota Department of Natural Resources divides the state of Minnesota into regions based on the agency's Ecological Classification System (ECS), which follows the guidelines set forth by the National Hierarchical Framework of Ecological Units.

World Wildlife Fund

 Canadian aspen forests and parklands
 Central tall grasslands (consisting of parts of 251B (North Central Glaciated Plains) and 222M – Minnesota and Northeast Iowa Morainal) along with parts of 251C (Central Dissected Till plains) which are not in Minnesota.
 Northern tall grasslands
 Western Great Lakes forests
 Upper Midwest forest-savanna transition

References

 
Ecoregions
Ecoregions
Minnesota